Minor league baseball teams based in Fayetteville, North Carolina played between 1910 and 1956. The  Fayetteville teams played as members of the  Eastern Carolina Association in 1910, Eastern Carolina League in 1909, 1911, 1928 to 1929 and Carolina League from 1953 to 1956. The early minor league teams preceded today's Fayetteville Woodpeckers, who began play in the Carolina League in 2019.

The Fayetteville Highlanders were minor league affiliates of the Philadelphia Athletics in 1953, Baltimore Orioles in 1955 and Cleveland Indians in 1956.

Jim Thorpe, Olympic Champion and Pro Football Hall of Fame member played for the 1910 Fayetteville Highlanders.

History
Beginning in 1909, Fayetteville first hosted minor league baseball, when the Fayetteville Highlanders joined the Eastern Carolina League, playing at Cape Fear Fairgrounds Park. The Fayetteville Highlanders continued as members of the Eastern Carolina League (1909, 1911, 1928–1929) and Eastern Carolina Association (1910). The Highlanders captured the 1910 Eastern Carolina Association Championship. Jim Thorpe, Olympic Champion and Pro Football Hall of Fame inductee played for the 1910 championship team.

The Fayetteville Cubs(1946–1948) were members of the Coastal Plain League (1946) and Tri-State League (1947–1948), playing at Pittman Stadium. The Fayetteville Cubs were an affiliate of the Chicago Cubs and captured the 1948 Tri-State League Championship. In 1947, Rocky Marciano traveled to Fayetteville with friends to try out for the team. Marciano lasted three weeks and was cut. He would return home to Brockton, Massachusetts and begin his professional boxing career.

In 1949, the Fayetteville Scotties played as members of Tobacco State League.

The Fayetteville Athletics began play in the 1950 Carolina League, finishing 47–106 in their first season. They were an affiliate of the Philadelphia Athletics (1950–1952). The Athletics had a regular season record of  59–79 in 1951 and 93–73 in 1952, finishing in 7th place both seasons.

The 1953 Fayetteville Hilanders continued play in the Carolina league. The Hilanders captured Carolina League Championships in 1953 (86–51) and 1956 (78–71). The Hilanders were affiliates of the Philadelphia Athletics (1953), Baltimore Orioles (1955) and Cleveland Indians (1956).

The ballparks
The 1909 and 1911 Highlanders were noted to have played home minor league games at Cape Fear Fairgrounds Park. The ballpark was located on Gillespie Street in Fayetteville, North Carolina. today, the site has a marker for a Babe Ruth home run, that has his first professional home run, hit in a March, 1914 spring training game.

The Highland Park Base Ball Grounds was referenced to have hosted the Highlanders in 1928 and 1929. Highland Park Base Ball Grounds had a capacity of 300 and was located at Grove (3B) Street at Cross Creek in Fayetteville, North Carolina. It was on the Cape Fear River. Today, the site hosts the Cape Fear Botanical Gardens.

Beginning in 1946, Fayetteville teams were noted to have played home games at Pittman Stadium. The ballpark had a capacity of 4,000 (1950) and dimensions of (Left, Center, Right): 350-400-330. It was located on Bragg Boulevard in Fayetteville, North Carolina. For a time, it was known as Cumberland Memorial Stadium.

Notable alumni

Johnny Allen (1928) MLB All-Star
 Jim Brosnan (1948)
Smoky Burgess (1947) 9x MLB All-Star; Cincinnati Reds Hall of Fame
Jack McKeon (1955, MGR) Manager: 2003 World Series Champion - Florida Marlins; 2× NL Manager of the Year (1999, 2003);San Diego Padres Hall of Fame
 Erskine Mayer (1910)
 Van Mungo (1929) 5x MLB All-Star
 Dan Osinski (1956)
 Arnie Portocarrero (1950)
 Aaron Robinson (1954-1955, MGR) MLB All-Star
 Jim Thorpe (1910) Olympic Champion; Pro Football Hall of Fame
 Pep Young (1928)

See also
Fayetteville Highlanders players

See also
Fayetteville, North Carolina

References

Fayetteville, North Carolina